Pereta is a village in Tuscany, central Italy, administratively a frazione of the comune of Magliano in Toscana, province of Grosseto, in the area of Maremma. At the time of the 2001 census its population amounted to 182.

Pereta is about 36 km from Grosseto and 9 km from Magliano in Toscana, and it is situated along the Provincial Road which links Magliano with Scansano.

Main sights 
 San Giovanni Battista (13th century), main parish church of the village.
 Pieve di Santa Maria Assunta (15th century), it was restructured in the 19th century.
 Clock tower (15th century), the most ancient building in Pereta, because it is the only one which has never been restructured.
 Walls of Pereta, old fortifications which surround the village since the 13th century.
 Porta di Ponente, main gate and access to the medieval village.

References

Bibliography 
 Aldo Mazzolai, Guida della Maremma. Percorsi tra arte e natura, Le Lettere, Florence, 1997.

See also 
 Magliano in Toscana
 Montiano, Magliano in Toscana

Frazioni of Magliano in Toscana